The Somerset House Conference, 1604 is an oil-on-canvas painting depicting the Somerset House Conference held in 1604 to negotiate the end the Anglo-Spanish War. It is a group portrait, depicting the 11 representatives of the governments of England, Spain and the Spanish Netherlands, seated around a conference table, probably in Old Somerset House.

Background
Queen Elizabeth I died in 1603, and her successor James I quickly sought to end the 18 years of conflict. Philip III of Spain had also inherited the war from his predecessor Philip II.  Both new kings were happy to end the expensive and distracting conflict.

The conference was held in 18 sessions between 20 May and 16 July 1604.  The treaty was signed on 16 August, and restored the status quo ante bellum.  Spain was compelled to recognise the Protestant monarchy in England, and England ended its financial and military support for the Dutch rebellion since the Treaty of Nonsuch in 1585.  Following the signing of the treaty, England and Spain remained at peace until 1625.

James gave the Spanish delegates generous gifts, including the Royal Gold Cup which was given to the leader of the Spanish delegation, Juan Fernández de Velasco, 5th Duke of Frías.

Painting
The painting bears a signature of Spanish painter Juan Pantoja de la Cruz and is dated 1594, but both signature and date are thought to be false.  The painter is unknown but may be Flemish, possibly John De Critz (the Elder).  The room depicted is likely to be an interior in Old Somerset House (rebuilt from 1775).

The work includes portraits of the 11 government representatives, each seated in an elaborate chair of estate to either side of a long rectangular table covered by a fine oriental carpet of the so-called Holbein carpet type, a common object of luxury to display in Jacobean portraiture.  In front of Robert Cecil are a pewter ink-pot, a quill and a piece of paper.  Leaded window behind the sitters reveals a courtyard with shrubs.  The tapestries on the walls to either side bear the date 1560, and there are rushes on the floor.

Depicted on the right side of the table are the five English delegates representing James I; in order of precedence, from the window:
 Thomas Sackville, 1st Earl of Dorset (1536-1608), Poet and Lord Treasurer, who led the English delegation
 Charles Howard, 1st Earl of Nottingham (1536-1624), Lord High Admiral and Lord Steward
 Charles Blount, 1st Earl of Devonshire (1563-1606), Master-General of the Ordnance
 Henry Howard, 1st Earl of Northampton (1540-1614), Lord Warden of the Cinque Ports
 Robert Cecil, Viscount Cranborne, later 1st Earl of Salisbury (1563-1612), Secretary of State, James I's leading minister

On the left is the delegation from Spain representing Philip III; in order from the window:
 Juan Fernández de Velasco, 5th Duke of Frías, Constable of Castile, leader of the Austro/Flemish and Spanish delegation (although he was ill and did not attend the conference)
 Juan de Tassis, 1st Count of Villamediana
 Alessandro Robida, Senator of Milan

And then the delegation from the Spanish Netherlands representing Albert VII, Archduke of Austria:
 Charles de Ligne, 2nd Prince of Arenberg
 Jean Richardot, President of the Brussels Privy Council
 Louis Verreyken, Audiencier of Brussels and Principal Secretary

One version, thought to be the original, is held by the National Portrait Gallery, London, and a copy at the National Maritime Museum, Greenwich.

References
 The Somerset House Conference, 1604, National Portrait Gallery
 Great Britons, National Portrait Gallery
 The Somerset House Conference, 19 August 1604, National Maritime Museum

1600s paintings
Paintings in the National Portrait Gallery, London
English paintings
Paintings in the collection of Royal Museums Greenwich
Group portraits